Aldo Barbero (13 February 1937 – 27 October 2013) was an Argentine actor who made over 65 appearances in film and TV in Argentine since the early 1960s.

In 1971 he appeared in the musical Balada para un mochilero directed by Carlos Rinaldi which starred Jose Marrone.

In 1977 he starred in La Aventura explosiva a film which co-starred Víctor Bó.

Filmography 
 The Curious Dr. Humpp (1969)
 What's Autumn? (1977)
 The Island (1979)

References

External links 
 

Argentine male film actors
1938 births
2013 deaths